is a Japanese light novel series by Hajime Taguchi. It was adapted into an anime television series by Studio Gokumi. The anime was aired between July 6 and September 28, 2012. The anime series is licensed by Sentai Filmworks and streamed on Crunchyroll and Anime Network.

Synopsis
The  is a worldwide business company based in Japan and led by Kumagoro Mikadono. He names his son Shogo heir to his position in the company. However, after Kumagoro dies, his widow Kanoko becomes the new acting chairman as Shogo transfers to his father's alma mater Miryuin Private Academy. According to his father's will, Shogo will take over the company after he graduates provided that he finds a life partner before then. Fortunately, there is a large female population at Miryuin Academy to choose from. Life at the academy will not be all smooth sailing, however. He is immediately popular because of his name and position as heir to Kumagoro's company and has caught the eye of several female students. To complicate matters further, although he was raised as an only child, Shogo apparently has a younger half-sister who was raised separately who also goes to the same school and intends to get closer to him without revealing her true identity. How will he act knowing that any girl he chooses to be his life partner may also be his sister?

Characters

Main characters

The male protagonist who is the heir of the Mikadono Group. For him to take over as chairman of the Group, he needs to graduate from school as well as find a life partner. However, things become complicated when he learns that his father, Kumagoro, had an illegitimate daughter who is watching over him as well as attending the same school. This leads to Shogo trying to find his sister. He has a scar on his forehead from an accident when he was kid that caused him to lose some of his memories. Eventually Shogo chooses Konoe to be his lover but she is revealed to be Kumagoro's illegitimate daughter. Eventually, it is revealed that he is not Kumagoro's biological son and thus they are not related.
 

A black-haired young girl who attends the same school as Shogo and also the first friend he makes on his first day of his new life. Very curious and believing in destined meetings, she is in the same class as Shogo as well as the class representative. She loves creme puffs. She revealed later that she was Shogo's childhood friend and feels responsible for the accident which landed him in hospital. She has the same phone as the mysterious shadowy figure shown once calling Shogo. It is later revealed that she was also the one who sent him the cake, photo, and action figure on his birthday. She initially called him using the voice of Perin a character from "Transforming Warrior Granberion". She is in love with Shogo. This is underscored when she tells Shogo, "When we were kids, I wanted to be your sister. I figured we could be together forever that way." The phone she used was a prototype developed by her father with a rare voice changer feature. Eventually she becomes Shogo's lover but also reveals that she is Kumagoro's illegitimate daughter. However, in volume 9 it is discovered that Shogo is not Kumagoro's biological son and thus she is not really Shogo's sister.

Another classmate of Shogo and a member of the swimming club. Miyabi revealed that she met Shogo at the hospital where he was recovering from his accident—whenever her father went in for treatments, she would play outside with him. When Shogo first attempted to speak to her upon meeting her in class, she refused to talk to him. After that, she overheard his conversation with Konoe and after seeing them almost kiss, demands that he kiss her. She reasons that after Shogo calls Konoe "just a classmate," it should be fine for him to kiss her as well. When she tells Shogo of their previous relationship together, she also confesses (with Konoe present) that she fell in love with Shogo as a child and along with Konoe was elated upon learning of his transfer to their school. She is competitive with Konoe about wanting to marry Shogo, to the point where they will argue about it in front of him. As the story progresses, she often interrupts romantic moments between Shogo and Konoe. At the end of the anime and in volume 4 of the novel, she is believed to be his sister. However, in volume 8, after another DNA test it is discovered that she is actually his cousin. Eventually, Miyabi becomes Shogo's stepsister when her father and Kanoko marry.

Rinka is the blonde first-year student council vice-president of Miryuin Private Academy and it is implied that she was brought up in a noble family. After Shogo transferred into Miryuin, Konoe calls her "a princess to the core." Rinka keeps Mana in line and is shown to be very good at dancing. She is a distant character who has a tendency to be competitive. Rinka reveals that school director Genda asked her to find Shogo's sister so that he would have leverage when working with the Mikadono Group. Rinka uses Sagara's phone to make her fake sister announcement to threaten the director. Shogo was able to figure out her scheme and subsequently volunteered to pretend to be her lover to invalidate her engagement to director Genda's son. Thereafter, Rinka decided to pursue Shogo as her true boyfriend.

The student council president of Miryuin Private Academy. She has a childish personality, and is generally on the quieter side except for big events, where she gets really excited and tends to be more outgoing and loud.

A third-year silver-haired bespectacled girl who dresses as a witch. She runs the Lyrical Sister Café which she describes as "a dream-like café where anyone can become an older brother or older sister!" Prior to the story, her biological parents abandoned her as a toddler because of her mathematical intellect and she was adopted by a university professor. She lived with her adoptive mother who owned and ran the café until she died. Afterwards Mei lived with her father in Massachusetts until she earned enough money to buy back the café. She and Konoe have the same brand phone. It is later revealed that she knows the identity of Shogo's sister, but does not want to expose her to the Mikadono family because she is an illegitimate child. After Shogo promises to protect her, she responds that she will reveal his sister's identity if he proves that he can be a good older brother.

A mysterious girl who poses as Shogo's real sister. However she is revealed to be responsible for the incidents that have occurred around him at the school. It is revealed that she is in allegiance with rivals of the Mikadono Group to cause a scandal for Shogo.

Supporting characters

A member of the Seiryu Association. Initially introduced as "Mister X", she was sent to investigate on the identity of Shogo's younger sister while disguising herself as a male student in Miryuin Private Academy. She often sneaks into Shogo's apartment to use his shower as part of her routine. She is trying to become a modern day ninja, and as the Seiryu Association is men-only, she disguised herself as a guy to become part of the association. She often puts Shogo in awkward situations.

 Shogo's father, who was the chairman of the Mikadono Group. He is also a friend of Konoe's father. He is assumed to have fathered an illegitimate daughter but Kanoko does not want anything to do with the child, thus Shogo has no leads as to who the girl's identity is.

 Shogo's mother. She becomes the acting chairman of the Mikadono Group until Shogo is ready to take over.

Secretary and a close aide of Kanoko. Shogo entrusted her help to perform a DNA test to verify his real sister. However, she was discovered by Ikusu to be in allegiance with Yuzurina to invalidate Shogo's bid to take over the Mikadono Group.

 A first year student and a waitress at Lyrical Sisters Café. She is also cheerful and cute.

 She is the diminutive homeroom teacher in the class Shogo attends. Her personality is very aggressive, and she hates people who ask stupid questions. On top of that, she looks like a child due to her small stature.

Media

Light novels

Manga

Anime

Nakaimo - My Sister Is Among Them!, was adapted into a twelve episode anime with a special OVA episode. In April, 2012 it was announced that Studio Gokumi would be adapting the light novel series into an anime for an airing sometime in June. Between April 5, and June 28 promotional ads were streamed announcing the anime's start date to be July 6, 2012 by TBS. In September 2012 Japanese production company Media factory released the entire series on DVD and Blu-ray, a special unaired OVA entitled "Brother, Sister, Lover" was bundled with the release. In addition to the OVA, bonus material included footage from a special event that took place on July 16. The Blu-ray's jacket also features cover art done by the illustrator of the light novel series.

Shortly after its first airing in Japan, Crunchyroll announced in July of that year that it would stream live a subtitled version of the series with the new episodes that come out. In addition, Anime Network also streamed episodes alongside crunchyroll. Sentai Filmworks later announced during Otakon 2012 that took place in late July, that it had acquired the license to the series. Sentai confirmed the cast for the English dub in October 2013. The following month, the series was released in North America on November 12, 2013.

Reception

The English language adaptation of the anime, released in North America received mixed reviews. Allen Moody from THEM anime reviews, gave the series one star out of five. He called the plot a simple mystery that isn't challenging, and pointed out multiple anime clichés such as the loss of important childhood memories. Andy Hanley from UK Anime Network gave the first four episodes of the series a 2/10 rating citing many plot holes, and "wafer thin" characters. He goes on to say good things though about the character designs and animation as the only redeeming qualities. Chris Beveridge from the Fandom Post gave the series a more positive review saying that there are likeable main characters, with each earning "their time in the sun". Chris had previously given the first two episodes a C rating calling the animation "very cheap and stiff" in a lot of scenes, and Shogo's character "bland". Active Anime also gave the series a good review, describing it as good for people who love romantic comedies with fan service. The review also points out that they left the anime ending on a "pretty good" spot in the story as the light novel series hadn't finished in Japan. Jeff Chuang from Japanator called the series "above average" for its harem genre, but also said it isn't an anime for those who cannot handle the intense sex jokes.

Notes
 The dates in the source used go by Japanese Standard Time.

References

External links
 
 
Nakaimo anime at Sentai Filmworks (English licenser)
English dub at Crunchyroll 

2010 Japanese novels
2011 manga
2012 anime television series debuts
Anime and manga based on light novels
Harem anime and manga
Light novels
Media Factory manga
MF Bunko J
Kadokawa Dwango franchises
Seinen manga
Sentai Filmworks
Studio Gokumi
Television shows based on light novels
TBS Television (Japan) original programming